The President of the Autonomous Region of Bougainville governs the island, which is an autonomous entity within Papua New Guinea.

List of presidents of the Autonomous Region of Bougainville 

The first President of Bougainville was Joseph Kabui, who was elected in June 2005, following the 2000 peace agreement which ended the Bougainville War. Kabui died of an apparent heart attack on 7 June 2008, and Vice-President John Tabinaman took over as Acting President until a new election was held.

Previous regional leaders

Bougainville has been headed by several different types of administration: a decentralised administration headed by a Premier (as North Solomons Province from 1975 to 1990), an appointed administrator during the height of the Bougainville Civil War (from 1990 to 1995), a Premier heading the Bougainville Transitional Government (from 1995 to 1998), the co-chairmen of the Bougainville Constituent Assembly (1999), a Governor heading a provincial government as in other parts of Papua New Guinea (2000 to 2005) and the Autonomous Bougainville Government (since 2005).

President of the secessionist Republic of North Solomons (1975)

Premiers (1975–1990)

Administrators (1990–1995)

Premiers (1995–1998)

Bougainville Constituent Assembly Co-chairmen (1999)

Governors (1999–2005)

References 

Politics of Papua New Guinea
 
Autonomous Region of Bougainville
2005 establishments in Papua New Guinea